Un aller simple (One Way Ticket) may refer to:

 Un aller simple (1971 film)
 One-Way, a French novel with the original title Un aller simple
 Un aller simple (2001 film), an adaptation of the novel